Rineloricaria morrowi is a species of catfish in the family Loricariidae. It is native to South America, where it occurs in the Ucayali River basin in Peru. The species reaches  in standard length and is believed to be a facultative air-breather.

References 

Catfish of South America
Fish described in 1940
Loricariini
Taxa named by Henry Weed Fowler